Shen Peiping (born February 1962) is a former Chinese politician from Yunnan province. Between 2013 and 2014 Shen served as the Vice Governor of Yunnan province. He also once served as the Mayor and then Party Secretary of Pu'er. He was investigated in March 2014 by the Communist Party's internal disciplinary organ.

Career
Shen was born in Shidian County, Yunnan in February 1962. Shen entered Baoshan University in September 1979, majoring in Chinese language, where he graduated in August 1981.

After the Chinese economic reform, Shen became involved in politics in August 1981 and joined the Chinese Communist Party in April 1985.

In August 1981, Shen worked as a teacher in Shidian Meddle School until July 1989.

In July 1989, he worked in People's Government office of Shidian County as an officer, until October 1996.

In January 1998 he was promoted to become party chief of Tengchong County (now Tengchong), a position he held until January 2003.

Shen served as the deputy secretary general of People's Government of Yunnan Province between January 2003 to November 2004.

In November 2004, he was appointed the deputy party chief of Simao and mayor of Simao, he remained in that position until April 2007, when he was transferred to Pu'er and appointed the deputy party chief and mayor of Pu'er. Shen was elevated to the party chief of Pu'er in December 2009.

In January 2013, Shen was promoted to become the vice-governor of Yunnan.

Downfall
On March 9, 2014, Shen was being investigated by the Central Commission for Discipline Inspection for "serious violations of laws and regulations". Shen was expelled from the Chinese Communist Party in August 2014, his case was then moved to judicial authorities for criminal proceedings. On December 3, 2015, Shen Peiping was sentenced 12 years in jail for taking bribes worth 16.15 million yuan (~$2.5 million) by the First Intermediate People's Court in Beijing.

References

1962 births
People from Shidian County, Yunnan
Baoshan University alumni
Central Party School of the Chinese Communist Party alumni
Beijing Normal University alumni
Living people
Expelled members of the Chinese Communist Party
Vice-governors of Yunnan
Chinese politicians convicted of corruption